Siam Commercial Bank is a Thai bank that was founded on 30 January 1907.

History 
SCB was founded as the "Book Club" on 4 October 1904 by Prince Jayanta Mongkol, a brother of King Chulalongkorn (Rama V), who was convinced that the time was ripe for Siam to have its own banking system to help foster the country's economic development, rather than rely on foreign banks operating branches in the country. The name "Book Club" was chosen in an effort to keep the project sub rosa as it was something of an experiment. After the success of the "Book Club", King Chulalongkorn granted royal approval for it to officially operate as a commercial bank under the name "The Siam Commercial Bank" on 30 January 1907.

SCB opened its headquarters in Bangkok's Talat Noi District in 1910. In 1911, it was granted approval to display the royal Garuda symbol as a royal warrant by King Vajiravudh (Rama VI).

Milestones
1939: SCB changed its name to "Siam Commercial Bank" in English, and "Thanakarn Thai Panich" in Thai.
1983: SCB introduced Thailand's first automated teller machines. and established the Thai Bank Museum
1993: SCB registered as a public company and was henceforth known as "The Siam Commercial Bank Public Company Limited".

Subsidiaries 
 SCB Asset Management
 SCB Protect
 SCB Julius Baer
 SCB Plus

Management
Dr. Vichit Suraphongchai, Chairman of the Board and Chairman of the Corporate Social Responsibility Committee
Mr. Arthid Nanthawithaya, Director, Member of the Executive Committee and Member of the Technology Committee
Mr. Kris Chantanotoke, Director and Chief Executive Officer

References

 
Thai Royal Warrant holders
Banks established in 1904
Companies listed on the Stock Exchange of Thailand
Companies based in Bangkok
1904 establishments in Siam
Vajiralongkorn